The women's 10,000 metres event at the 1990 World Junior Championships in Athletics was held in Plovdiv, Bulgaria, at Deveti Septemvri Stadium on 10 August.

Medalists

Results

Final
10 August

Participation
According to an unofficial count, 18 athletes from 14 countries participated in the event.

References

10,000 metres
Long distance running at the World Athletics U20 Championships